Kota Pinang is a town in North Sumatra province of Indonesia and it is the seat (capital) of South Labuhan Batu Regency.

Climate
Kota Pinang has a tropical rainforest climate (Af) with heavy rainfall year-round.

References

Populated places in North Sumatra
Regency seats of North Sumatra